Major League Soccer is the premier professional soccer league in the United States and Canada. Competition began in 1996 and attendance has grown rapidly since the early 2000s, making it one of the fastest-growing sports leagues in the world. The average attendance of 21,692 in 2016 was a 57% increase over the 13,756 average in 2000. The total attendance of 7,375,144 in 2016 is more than triple the 2,215,019 total of 2002. Similar to Major League Baseball and the National Hockey League, attendance is based on the number of tickets distributed.

As of the 2022 regular season, average attendance is 21,033 per match. The league drew 10 million spectators overall during the season, a new record. MLS's all-time average attendance record was 22,106, set in 2017. A crowd of 73,019 spectators watched the inaugural MLS match for Charlotte FC on March 5, 2022, setting a new league record for standalone attendance. Atlanta United FC has the highest average attendance of any MLS team, at 47,116, and is followed by Charlotte FC and Seattle Sounders FC.

2022 season

The following is a list of the average attendance during the 2022 regular season for each of the 28 MLS teams that were active in that season. It also includes the average attendance during the 2019 regular season (the last to be unaffected by the COVID-19 pandemic), the percentage change in attendance from season-to-season, the home venue, the home venue's capacity, and the percent of the home venue's capacity filled by the 2022 season's average attendance. Percentages are adjusted to reflect any home games that were held at venues other than the team's usual stadium.

Notes
Some clubs have attendances over 100% capacity due to limited stadium capacity that is lifted during certain matches, when additional sections are opened. Other clubs use larger venues for certain matches that attract large attendances.

Season averages

Notes:
 Green shading indicates record highs; red shading indicates record lows.
 The drop in number of games and total attendance from 2000 to 2002, and the corresponding increase in average attendance, is attributable to league contraction, when MLS folded the Miami Fusion and Tampa Bay Mutiny.
 Several seasons saw increases in total attendance, despite drops in average attendance. One such case was due to expansion of the regular-season schedule; all others were due to league expansion.
 The 2020 and 2021 seasons were affected by the COVID-19 pandemic, which restricted many matches to zero spectators.

MLS Cup Playoffs attendance

Notes:
 The format for the MLS Cup Playoffs has changed several times during its history, resulting in inconsistent numbers of matches played.
 The 2020 playoffs were affected by the COVID-19 pandemic, which restricted many matches to zero spectators. Only two matches were played in front of spectators, each with a maximum capacity of 1,500 people.

MLS attendance vs. other North American leagues
The following table compares the Major League Soccer regular-season average attendance against the regular-season average attendance for the other professional sports leagues in North America that have average attendances of at least 10,000 spectators per game.

MLS attendance vs. other soccer leagues worldwide

Historic average attendances

Current active teams

Defunct teams 

Notes:
 Bold indicates franchise record high for season average attendance.

Individual game highest attendance

Regular season

MLS Cup Playoffs

Doubleheader games highest attendance

MLS ranking among pro sports leagues average attendance by metro area
The table is sorted by MLS attendance average rank, and then by MLS attendance.

Only attendances in MLS and the traditional major professional sports leagues of the U.S. and Canada are listed here. Not listed are college football teams, some of which outdraw some major professional teams.
 

MLS, NFL, CFL, and MLB attendances are for their 2019 seasons. NBA and NHL attendances are for their 2018–19 seasons.

See also 
 Record attendances in United States club soccer
 List of Major League Soccer stadiums
 National Women's Soccer League attendance

References

Attendance
Major League Soccer
Major League Soccer records and statistics